Milford GAA is a Gaelic Athletic Association based in the village of Milford, County Cork, Ireland. The club participates in competitions organized by Cork GAA county board and the Avondhu divisional board. The club fields hurling and camogie teams, and Gaelic football under the name Deel Rovers.

Achievements
 Cork Intermediate Hurling Championship Winners (1) 1982
 Cork Junior Hurling Championship Winners (1) 1981
 Cork Junior Football Championship Runners-Up 1991
 Cork Minor C Hurling Championship Winners (1) 1995
 Cork Under-21 Hurling Championship Winners (1) 1978  Runner-Up 1977, 1979, 1982
 North Cork Junior A Hurling Championship Winners (5) 1926, 1933, 1935, 1936, 1981  Runner-Up 1979, 1990
 North Cork Junior A Football Championship Winners (2) 1981, 1991  Runners-Up 1982, 1985, 1992, 1994, 1996, 1997
 Cork Camogie Senior Championship Winners (4) 2012, 2013, 2014, 2015  Runner-Up 2004, 2009, 2011
 All-Ireland Senior Club Camogie Championship Winners (3) 2013, 2014, 2016,

Notable players
 Pat Buckley
 Eoin Dillon
 Seán O'Gorman
 Anna Geary
 Ashling Thompson

References

Gaelic games clubs in County Cork
Hurling clubs in County Cork